"Take Time to Know Her" is a song written by Steve Davis and performed by Percy Sledge.  It reached #5 on the Canadian pop chart, #6 on the U.S. R&B chart, and #11 on the U.S. pop chart in 1968.  It was featured on his 1968 album Take Time to Know Her.

The song was produced by Marlin Greene and Quin Ivy.

The song ranked #54 on Billboard magazine's Top 100 singles of 1968.

Personnel
Credits are adapted from the liner notes of The Muscle Shoals Sound: 3614 Jackson Highway.
Barry Beckett – piano
Jerry Eddleman – backing vocals
Jeannie Greene – backing vocals
Roger Hawkins – drums
Eddie Hinton – lead guitar
David Hood – bass guitar
Jimmy Johnson – rhythm guitar
Spooner Oldham – organ
Sandy Posey – backing vocals
Percy Sledge – lead vocals
Hershel Wiggington – backing vocals

Other charting versions
Joe Stampley released a version of the song as a single in 1971 which reached #74 on the U.S. country chart.
David Allan Coe released a version of the song as a single in 1982 which reached #58 on the U.S. country chart.

Other versions
Ben Branch and Orchestra released a version of the song as the B-side to his 1968 single "The Big One".
Davis released a version of the song as a single in 1968, but it did not chart.
O.C. Smith released a version of the song on his 1968 album Hickory Holler Revisited.
Tommie Young released a version of the song as a single in 1972, but it did not chart.
Jody Miller released a version of the song on her 1976 album Will You Love Me Tomorrow.
Harry Hippy released a version of the song on his 1977 album with Dennis Brown entitled Dennis Brown Meets Harry Hippy.
John Hiatt released a version of the song as the B-side to his 1982 single "I Look for Love".
John Mooney released a version of the song on his 1992 album Testimony.
Zydeco Force released a version of the song on their 2001 album You Mean the World to Me.

References

1968 songs
1968 singles
1971 singles
1972 singles
1982 singles
Songs written by Stephen Allen Davis
Percy Sledge songs
Joe Stampley songs
David Allan Coe songs
Jody Miller songs
John Hiatt songs
Song recordings produced by Billy Sherrill
Song recordings produced by Tony Visconti
Atlantic Records singles
Fontana Records singles